Delta Bank was one of the largest commercial banks in Ukraine. It was founded in February 2006 by Ukrainian businessman Mykola Lagun. It had its headquarters in Kyiv. Since 2006 the bank quickly increased due to consumer credit. The Bank ranked among the largest banks in its category according to the classification of the National Bank of Ukraine. In 2013 the Delta Bank provided services to 4.6 million customers in Ukraine.

In July 2011, Cargill Financial Services International Inc. acquired 30% authorized capital stock in Delta Bank.

On 2 March 2015 Delta Bank declared insolvent. The bank cited risky policies during a period of economic turmoil as the reason for its bankruptcy. On 2 October 2015 the National Bank of Ukraine revoked its bank licence and liquidated the bank.

See also 

List of banks in Ukraine

References

External links
  

Defunct banks of Ukraine
Ukrainian companies established in 2006
Banks established in 2006
Banks disestablished in 2015
2015 disestablishments in Ukraine